Wayne Besen is an American LGBT rights advocate. He is a former investigative journalist for WABI-TV, a former spokesman for the Human Rights Campaign, and the founder of Truth Wins Out. Besen came out to his parents before starting his Truth Wins Out Organization. After coming out to his parents, they bought him an ex-gay DVD that could supposedly hypnotize people and turn them straight. It was that and the invitation by President George W. Bush of ex-gay leader Alan Chambers to the White House that led him to start the Truth Wins Out organization.

Besen has interviewed hundreds of former and current "ex-gays", and is an outspoken critic of organizations such as Homosexuals Anonymous.

Early life and Education
Born into a non-religious, liberal Jewish family, Besen attended Kaiser High School in Honolulu, HI. After high school, Besen studied at the University of Florida, where he graduated with a Bachelor of Science degree in broadcast journalism in 1993. While in Florida, Besen helped co-found his first non-profit organization in 1992. Named the Sons & Daughters of America (SDA), the group headed a public awareness campaign focused around gay and lesbian injustices.

Photos of John Paulk
In September 2000, Besen photographed ex-gay activist John Paulk, then Chairman of Exodus International, in a Washington D.C. gay bar called Mr. P's. Paulk said he was simply there to use the washroom, but Besen and other witnesses allege he was drinking and flirting for over 20 minutes. Besen went public with the story, and wrote about it in his book Anything But Straight: Unmasking the Scandals and Lies Behind the Ex-Gay Myth. The book was nominated for two Lambda Literary Awards in 2003.

Besen's photograph of Paulk in September 2000 (and the subsequent release of the story) was instrumental in the ultimate removal of Paulk as Chairman of Exodus International.  Exodus International was a major organization in the "Ex-gay movement" until it was disbanded in June 2013. As noted by The Washington Post in October 2002, "John Paulk had been the most famous success story of the Christian ex-gay movement, which seeks to persuade gay men and lesbians to accept Jesus and renounce homosexuality. He had appeared on 60 Minutes, Oprah and the cover of Newsweek."

Criticism of Sam Brinton 
Besen has expressed skepticism about anti-conversion activist Sam Brinton's description of their childhood conversion therapy experience. Besen noted inconsistencies in Brinton's retelling of events, as well as Brinton's being unable to remember the therapist's name despite having had two years of sessions with him. In the aftermath of 2022 allegations of luggage theft against Brinton, Besen reiterated his concerns and accused various people and groups of failing to heed "clear warning signs" and of making decisions to accept Brinton's recounting of their experience without confirming its veracity as "sloppy, ethically negligent, and shockingly unprofessional" behavior that had given conservative groups and media a talking point to help them denigrate the LGBTQ+ community.

Opposition to Catholic activism
In November 2009, Besen wrote an opinion piece in the San Francisco Bay Times arguing that the gay community has a "gigantic Pope problem", and that under the leadership of Benedict XVI, the Vatican had become an enemy of liberalism, modernity, and LGBT rights. He was responding to the recent ecumenical manifesto Manhattan Declaration: A Call of Christian Conscience, which calls upon Christians to oppose laws and policies that attempt to undermine their private religious consciences.

References

External links
www.waynebesen.com
Anything but Straight (official website)
Truth Wins Out, of which Besen is the Founding Executive Director
Respect My Research website

Living people
American social sciences writers
American LGBT rights activists
People self-identified as ex-ex-gay
American gay writers
Jewish American writers
LGBT Jews
University of Florida alumni
Writers from Florida
1970 births
LGBT people from Florida
21st-century American Jews
Activists from Florida